Josh Dean is an American journalist and author, most recently of the non-fiction book The Taking of K-129: How the CIA Used Howard Hughes to Steal a Russian Sub in the Most Daring Covert Operation in History, which was published on September 5, 2017, by Penguin's Dutton imprint.

Dean served as deputy editor of Men's Journal until 2004. He has written for Rolling Stone, Popular Science, Men's Journal, GQ, Travel + Leisure, New York, Entertainment Weekly, Inc., Fast Company,  Men's Health, Runner's World. He is currently a correspondent for Outside. He was a founding editor of PLAY, The New York Times now-defunct sports magazine.

His first book was Show Dog (2012). His article/ebook, The Life and Times of the Stopwatch Gang, was optioned by Bluegrass Films/Universal Pictures.

Dean is the Co-creator and host of the true-crime audio documentary series, The Clearing, a co-production of Gimlet and Pineapple Street Studios.

In the fall of 2019, he started his own podcast company, Campside Media, with two journalists, Matthew Shaer and Vanessa Grigoriadis, and a third partner, Adam Hoff, who is a producer/screenwriter. Campside's lead investor is Sister Pictures, a new global entertainment studio founded by Elisabeth Murdoch, Stacey Snider, and Jane Featherstone. Its debut show, Chameleon, is about a notorious scammer known as the Hollywood Con Queen. The show helped expose the name of a suspect who was arrested just a few weeks later. Chameleon is part of a slate deal Campside has with Sony Podcasts.

Dean is the Co-Executive Producer and one of the main characters of Netflix's #1 American show Crime Scene: The Vanishing at the Cecil Hotel, which was inspired by his story about Elisa Lam and the Cecil Hotel.

His first book was Show Dog (2012). His article/ebook, The Life and Times of the Stopwatch Gang, was optioned by Bluegrass Films/Universal Pictures.

Dean is a graduate of Wittenberg University in Ohio, and lives in New York with his wife and two sons.

References

External links
 http://www.penguinrandomhouse.com/books/534584/the-taking-of-k-129-by-josh-dean/9781101984437/

Year of birth missing (living people)
Living people
American male journalists
Wittenberg University alumni